Theresa Rose Lawson (nee Emmett; 20 February 1951 – 2 June 2014) was a former Woolworths payroll clerk and St Marys Band Club director, who stole more than A$2.7 million over a three-year period from 1999 to 2002. It is regarded as one of the largest fraud cases in New South Wales history. The money has never been recovered.

Lawson as a head office clerk was in charge of the supermarket's cash float to cover staff wages, cash advances, and petty cash. Between January 1999 and March 2002 she stole weekly, falsifying the accounts to hide the amount of cash taken from the company's safe, needing no countersignature when ordering new cash, until caught with A$10,130 in her handbag. During that period, Lawson reportedly spent A$2.6 million on poker machine bets at the St Marys Band Club, where she was a director, and a further A$160,000 on television shopping channel purchases, clothing, jewellery, a cruise, a car and other travel.

Conviction
Lawson was convicted in the District Court of New South Wales in August 2004, on 129 charges including 19 of embezzlement to which she pleaded guilty. During the trial it was alleged that the stolen money was laundered through the St Marys Band Club poker machines, where as director she received more than 90 per cent of all machine payouts. Lawson had told staff she had received an inheritance, and also won a jackpot on the lottery. She was gaoled for seven years, with a non-parole period of four, at Mulawa Correctional Centre (now known as Silverwater Women's Correctional Centre), and released in 2008.

References

1951 births
2014 deaths
2004 crimes in Australia
21st-century Australian criminals
Australian fraudsters
People convicted of embezzlement
People convicted of fraud
People from Sydney
Woolworths Group (Australia)